Rapisarda is an Italian surname. Notable people with the surname include:

Alberto Rapisarda (born 1964), Italian comics artist
Alfio Rapisarda (born 1933), Vatican diplomat
Francesco Rapisarda (born 1992), Italian footballer
Giuseppe Rapisarda (born 1985), Swiss footballer

Italian-language surnames